20th Century with Mike Wallace is a documentary television program produced by CBS News Productions in association with A&E Network. It aired on The History Channel from approximately 1994–2005. It was hosted by veteran CBS correspondent and anchor Mike Wallace.

The program used footage gathered by CBS crews and contemporary reporting by CBS correspondents to document great events and movements of the 20th century, mainly the latter decades of that era. The range of topics is suggested by some of the program titles — "Underwater: The Great [Mississippi River] Flood of '93" (no. 52, 1996-04-10); "Coming home: Agent Orange and the Gulf War Syndrome" (no. 91, 1998-11-18); "Search for Peace in the Middle East" (no. 106, 1998-12-14); "China after Mao" (no. 116, 1999-03-05).

See also
 Estate of Martin Luther King, Jr., Inc. v. CBS, Inc.

References

External links

1994 American television series debuts
2005 American television series endings
1990s American television news shows
2000s American television news shows
1990s American documentary television series
2000s American documentary television series
History (American TV channel) original programming
Television series by CBS Studios
CBS News